Cantonment Hill is the name of several places:

Cantonment Hill, a section of Hong Kong Park
Cantonment Hill, Fremantle, at Fremantle, Western Australia

See also
Cantonment